Ethmia antennipilosa is a moth in the family Depressariidae. It is found in China (Guangxi).

The forewings are light grey, somewhat pale brown. There are fourteen irregularly shaped black spots or blotches scattered on the surface. The hindwings are pale grey.

Etymology
The species name refers to the specialized scales forming a hairbrush on the dorsal edge of the antenna and is derived from Latin antenna (meaning long projection) and pilosa (meaning hairy or pilose).

References

Moths described in 2004
antennipilosa